Animal Nocturno is the fourth studio album released by Guatemalan singer-songwriter Ricardo Arjona on February 9, 1993.

Reception 
AllMusic reviewer Jason Birchmeier awarded the album 4 stars stating "The lyrics of Animal Nocturno are rebellious and bohemian in a way that Arjona's later work isn't. The fame and accolades that followed the release of this album changed him in several ways. In the wake of Animal Nocturno, he grew increasingly sophisticated from both a lyrical and musical standpoint, and he steadily lost the everyman perspective that informs many of these songs. Fans of Arjona's latter-day work who dig this deep into his back catalog should find this album fascinating."

Track listing
All tracks by Ricardo Arjona except where noted.

 "Libre" (Free) – 3:35
 "Primera Vez" (First Time) – 3:46.
 "Mujeres" (Women) – 3:28.
 "Tiempo en Una Botella" ("Time in a Bottle") (Jim Croce) – 2:29.
 "Cómo Olvidarte" (How to Forget You) – 3:43
 "Solo" (Alone) (Arjona, Tony Jaffe, Joey Levine, David Spinozza) – 3:45.
 "Baila Conmigo" (Dance with Me) – 3:47.
 "Quién Diría" (Who Would Say) – 3:53.
 "Te Encontraré" (I'll Find You) – 4:28.
 "Así de Ilógico" (As Illogical as) – 3:59.
 "Animal Nocturno" (Nocturnal Animal) (Arjona, Jose Roberto Martinez) – 3:53.
 "Jesús, Verbo No Sustantivo" (Jesus, a verb, not a noun) – 6:48. (As a bonus track)

Sales and certifications

References

External links
 http://www.ricardoarjona.com/

1992 albums
Ricardo Arjona albums
Sony Discos albums